The thirteenth season of Saturday Night Live, an American sketch comedy series, originally aired in the United States on NBC between October 17, 1987 and February 27, 1988. Although the changes to the cast and writers were minimal, the season was cut short due to the 1988 Writers Guild of America strike.

Production
During a dress rehearsal for the season premiere, a fire broke out near Studio 8H and was planned to be postponed. However, episode host Steve Martin pushed the cast to carry on with the show, making the Steve Martin/Sting episode the only episode without a dress rehearsal.

Following the February 27 episode, the series went on a planned two-week hiatus with plans to return on March 12 (the host of which had yet to be announced). However, on March 7, the Writers Guild of America went on strike. The strike continued until August, thus cutting the season short at 13 episodes, tying the sixth season as the shortest season until it was surpassed by the thirty-third season twenty years later (which was also due to a writers' strike). Several planned episodes were cancelled, including one hosted by original cast member Gilda Radner (who was never able to host, as she discovered her ovarian cancer had returned and died the day of the next season's finale). Radner would have been the first former female cast member to host an episode; that distinction would not happen until Julia Louis-Dreyfus hosted in 2006.

Cast
Minimal changes occurred before the beginning of the season. Kevin Nealon was promoted to repertory status.

Cast roster

Repertory players
Dana Carvey
Nora Dunn
Phil Hartman
Jan Hooks
Victoria Jackson
Jon Lovitz
Dennis Miller
Kevin Nealon

Featured players
A. Whitney Brown

bold denotes Weekend Update anchor

Writers

New hires this season were Greg Daniels, Conan O'Brien and Bob Odenkirk.

The writers for this season included A. Whitney Brown, Tom Davis, Greg Daniels, Jim Downey, Al Franken, Jack Handey, Phil Hartman, George Meyer, Lorne Michaels, Conan O'Brien, Bob Odenkirk, Herb Sargent, David Borowitz, Rosie Shuster, Robert Smigel, Bonnie Turner, Terry Turner and Christine Zander. The head writer, like the previous season, was Jim Downey.

Episodes

Canceled episodes with booked guests

References

13
1987 American television seasons
1988 American television seasons
Saturday Night Live in the 1980s